Circular reasoning ("circle in proving"; also known as circular logic) is a logical fallacy in which the reasoner begins with what they are trying to end with. Circular reasoning is not a formal logical fallacy, but a pragmatic defect in an argument whereby the premises are just as much in need of proof or evidence as the conclusion, and as a consequence the argument fails to persuade. Other ways to express this are that there is no reason to accept the premises unless one already believes the conclusion, or that the premises provide no independent ground or evidence for the conclusion. Circular reasoning is closely related to begging the question, and in modern usage the two generally refer to the same thing.

Circular reasoning is often of the form: "A is true because B is true; B is true because A is true."  Circularity can be difficult to detect if it involves a longer chain of propositions.

History

The problem of circular reasoning has been noted in Western philosophy at least as far back as the Pyrrhonist philosopher Agrippa who includes the problem of circular reasoning among his Five Tropes of Agrippa. The Pyrrhonist philosopher Sextus Empiricus described the problem of circular reasoning as "the reciprocal trope":  

The reciprocal trope occurs when what ought to be confirmatory of the object under investigation needs to be made convincing by the object under investigation; then, being unable to take either in order to establish the other, we suspend judgement about both.

The problem of induction
Joel Feinberg and Russ Shafer-Landau note that "using the scientific method to judge the scientific method is circular reasoning". Scientists attempt to discover the laws of nature and to predict what will happen in the future, based on those laws. The laws of nature are arrived at through inductive reasoning. David Hume's problem of induction demonstrates that one must appeal to the principle of the uniformity of nature if they seek to justify their implicit assumption that laws which held true in the past will also hold true in the future. Since the principle of the uniformity of nature is itself an inductive principle, any justification for induction must be circular. But as Bertrand Russell observed, "The method of 'postulating' what we want has many advantages; they are the same as the advantages of theft over honest toil".

See also 

 Affirming the consequent
 Argument from authority
 Catch-22 (logic)
 Circular definition
 Circular reference
 Circular reporting
 Coherentism
 Formal fallacy
 I'm entitled to my opinion
 Ipse dixit, a fallacy that can be translated as "because I said so"
 List of cognitive biases
 Paradox
 Polysyllogism
 Problems with economic models
 Self-reference
 Tautology (logic)

References

External links 

Philosophical logic
Formal fallacies
Pyrrhonism